Joanna Natasegara is a British film director and producer. She produced Virunga (2014) and The White Helmets (2016), for which she received nominations for Academy Award in the categories of Best Documentary Feature and Best Documentary (Short Subject), respectively; she won the latter. Both nominations were shared with director Orlando von Einsiedel. She also worked on The Price of Kings, a documentary film series with each film focusing on a specific world leader.

Natasegara is a graduate of the Human Rights programme at the London School of Economics and Political Science.

Selected filmography 
 The Price of Kings: Oscar Arias (2012)
 The Price of Kings: Shimon Peres (2012)
 The Price of Kings: Yasser Arafat (2012)
 Virunga (2014)
 The White Helmets (2016)
 Evelyn (2018)
 The Edge of Democracy (2019)

References

External links 

 

British film directors
British film producers
Living people
British people of Malaysian descent
British people of Japanese descent
Directors of Best Documentary Short Subject Academy Award winners
Year of birth missing (living people)